Alan D. Grossman, is an American microbiologist; he is currently the Praecis Professor of Biology and head of the Department of Biology at the Massachusetts Institute of Technology. He is a member of the National Academy of Sciences and the American Academy of Arts & Sciences.

Education 
Grossman received a Bachelor of Science in biochemistry from Brown University in 1979. He earned his Ph.D. at the University of Wisconsin–Madison in 1984. Grossman completed a postdoctoral fellowship in the Department of Cellular and Developmental Biology at Harvard University before joining MIT's biology department in 1988.

Career
Grossman has served as head of the MIT's department of biology since 2014, when he succeeded Tania A. Baker.

Initially, his research was focused on characterization of bacterial chromosome segregation. His  group was among the first that identified the Spo0J protein, the homologue of ParB, responsible for the process of chromosome segregation in B. subtilis. He later moved on to show that Spo0J binds to specific cis-sites on the DNA in order to implement its function and identified the sequences of those cis-sites which was termed ParS.

In 2006, Grossman received a life-saving heart transplant. He has discussed the experience publicly and encouraged others to consider organ donation.

References

External links 

 

Year of birth missing (living people)
Living people
American microbiologists
Massachusetts Institute of Technology School of Science faculty
Members of the United States National Academy of Sciences
Brown University alumni
University of Wisconsin–Madison alumni